EnBW Baltic 2 is an offshore wind farm in the German section of the Kriegers Flak reef in the Baltic Sea.  
The wind farm uses 80 Siemens SWT 3.6-120 wind turbines for a total capacity of 288 megawatt.
Baltic 2 is connected to Germany via Baltic 1, but is also connected to Denmark via the adjacent offshore wind farm ″Kriegers Flak″ in 2020, creating a 400 MW AC offshore grid synchronized to the east Denmark network. The cable to Denmark costs €350m, of which €150m comes from the EU.

The  Baltic 2 produced power in September 2015.

See also
Wind power in Germany
List of offshore wind farms in Germany
List of offshore wind farms
List of offshore wind farms in the Baltic Sea

References

External links

Wind farms in Germany
EnBW
Offshore wind farms in the Baltic Sea
Energy infrastructure completed in 2015
2015 establishments in Germany